Minnesota State Highway 109 (MN 109) is a  highway in south-central Minnesota, which runs from its intersection with U.S. Highway 169 in Winnebago and continues east to its eastern terminus at its interchange with Interstate 90 in Alden.

Highway 109 passes through the cities of Winnebago, Wells, and Alden.

Route description

Highway 109 serves as an east–west route in south-central Minnesota between Winnebago, Delavan, Easton, Wells, and Alden.

Highway 109 runs concurrent with State Highway 22 on 2nd Avenue NW in the city of Wells for two blocks.

The route is also known as South Broadway in Alden.

Highway 109, together with State Highway 22 and I-90, are used by motorists as a direct route between Albert Lea and Mankato.

Highway 109 mostly parallels I-90 and State Highway 30 throughout its route. 109 intersects I-90 at its eastern terminus in Alden.

History
Highway 109 was authorized in 1933 between Alden and Wells. The route was expanded west of Wells to Winnebago in 1949.

The entire route was paved by 1953, including the expanded section between Wells and Winnebago.

Major intersections

References

109
Transportation in Faribault County, Minnesota
Transportation in Freeborn County, Minnesota